Straight Line Crazy is a play written by David Hare. The first production, directed by Nicholas Hytner, opened in previews at the Bridge Theatre in London on 16 March 2022 before officially premiering on 23 March 2022. The play is set in the 1920s through the 1960s in New York City and centres around the life of Robert Moses portrayed by Ralph Fiennes. Fiennes stars as Moses, once a powerful man in New York and the "master builder" of infrastructure from new parks and bridges to over 600 miles of expressways. During his working life, he served on the New York State Council of Parks and was the New York Secretary of State. Though never elected to office, he used a mix of charm and intimidation to manipulate the people and events in his favour including the Governor of New York Al Smith, portrayed in the play by Danny Webb. 

Motivated at first by a determination to improve the lives of New York City’s workers, he created new parks, new bridges and 627 miles of expressway to connect the people to the great outdoors. But in the 1950s, groups of citizens at grass roots began to organize against his schemes and against the motor car, campaigning for a very different idea of what a city was and for what it should be.

The play was shown in cinemas in association with National Theatre Live in the fall of 2022. It was announced that the production will make its New York stage debut, Off-Broadway at the The Shed running from October to December in 2022.

Background 
The play was written by British playwright David Hare and directed by Nicholas Hytner.

Plot 
The show revolves around Robert Moses who at the start of his career, helped create dozens of bridges and miles of road ostensibly to better serve the community. His charm helped him. His intimidating presence ensured that everyone listened to him. This change was met by public outcry though in later years. Regardless of his actions, Moses changed the New York City skyline.

Cast

Productions

2022 National Theatre 
The play originated at the National Theatre, written by David Hare, and directed by Nicholas Hytner, the production opened in previews at the Bridge Theatre in London on 16 March 2022 before officially premiering on 23 March 2022.

2022 Off-Broadway 
It was announced that the production will make its New York stage debut, Off-Broadway at the The Shed. This production will be directed jointly by Nicholas Hytner and Jamie Armitage with Fiennes returning. Preview performances began on 18 October and the production opened on 26 October with performances through 18 December 2022.

NT Live screenings 
A performance of the play was recorded and screened in UK cinemas on 26 May 2022, and shown in international locations on 8 September 2022, through NTLive.

Critical reception 
Critical reception for the play has been mostly positive, in particular for the leading performance of Robert Moses by Ralph Fiennes. Variety declared, "Fiennes is all boldly convincing, controlled threat, his monomania teetering on the edge of malevolence". In The Guardian'''s five star rave review, critic Mark Lawson described Fiennes' performance as "enthralling" adding, "This is Hare’s most dramatically gripping and politically thoughtful play since The Absence of War three decades ago and provides another acting triumph for Fiennes". The New York Times'' called the play "sputtering" though "still a pleasure," and described Fiennes' performance as "gloriously entertaining."

References 

Plays by David Hare
2022 plays
Works set in the 1920s
Works set in the 1950s
Works set in the 1960s